Sir Richard Guildford (alias Guilford, Guldeford, etc.), KG (c. 1450 – 1506) was an explorer, naval commander, and English courtier who held important positions at the court of Henry VII, including the office of Master of the Ordnance.

Life
He was the son of Sir John Guildford (1430–1493), Comptroller of the Household to Edward IV, by his first wife, Alice Waller. He was relied on as a councillor by Reginald Bray, who chose him as one of the four persons to whom he first communicated the plot behind Buckingham's rebellion against Richard III in 1483. Both father and son raised forces that year for the Earl of Richmond (the future Henry VII) in Kent, and were attainted in consequence. The son, who thereby forfeited some lands in Cranbrook, fled to Richmond in Brittany, and returned with him two years later, landing along with him at Milford Haven, where he is said to have been knighted. It is presumed he was with Henry at the Battle of Bosworth. Little more than a month later, on 29 September 1485, the new king appointed him one of the chamberlains of the receipt of exchequer, Master of the Ordnance and of the Armouries, with houses on Tower Wharf, and keeper of the royal manor of Kennington, where the king took up his abode before his coronation.

When Henry's first parliament met, his attainder was reversed. As master of the armoury he had to prepare the ‘justes’ for the king's coronation. The king also made him a privy councillor and granted him various lands and some wardships which fell vacant. Among the former was the manor of Higham in Sussex. His forte lay in the control of artillery and fortifications, engineering and shipbuilding, for which various payments to him are recorded. The lands he won from the sea  were called Guilford Level. In 1486 he received payment for the making of a ship in county of Kent; on 8 March 1487 he was paid as master of a vessel called the Mary Gylford, named probably after a daughter, who, in Henry VIII's time, was married to one Christopher Kempe. There were more payments for shipbuilding.

In 1487 the treasurer and barons of the exchequer had seized the office of chamberlain of the receipt, which had been granted to him by the king for life; but he obtained a warrant under the privy seal to prevent them proceeding further until the king himself had examined the official arrangements, with a view apparently to greater efficiency. A little later he surrendered the office, which was then granted to Giles Daubeny, 8th Baron Daubeny. On 14 July 1487 Guildford was granted the wardship, marriage and custody of her lands during her minority of Elizabeth Mortimer, daughter and heiress of Robert Mortimer (d. 22 August 1485) of Landmere in Thorpe-le-Soken, slain at Bosworth, by Isabel Howard, daughter of John Howard, 1st Duke of Norfolk. Guildford later married Elizabeth to his second son, George. In September 1489 certain alterations were ordered to be made in the buildings of Westminster Palace under the direction of Guildford and the Earl of Ormonde.

In 1490 Guildford undertook to serve the king at sea with 550 marines and soldiers, in three ships, for two months from 12 July. On 20 February 1492 Henry VII made his will in view of his proposed invasion of France, and appointed Guildford one of his trustees. He accompanied the king to Boulogne, and attended him at the meeting with the French commissioners for peace immediately after. On 1 February 1493 he was given the wardship and marriage of Thomas, grandson and heir of Sir Thomas Delamere. On 19 July he lost his father, Sir John Guildford, a privy councillor like himself, who was buried in Canterbury Cathedral. In 1493-4 he was appointed High Sheriff of Kent.

About 1495 he was named one of six commissioners to arrange with the Spanish ambassador about the marriage of Prince Arthur and Catherine of Aragon. In the parliament which assembled in October 1495 he was one of those members who announced to the chancellor the election of the speaker. In that parliament he obtained an act for disgavelling his lands in Kent. About this time he was controller of the royal household; and on 21 April 1496 he was made steward of the lands which had belonged to the Duchess of York in Surrey and Sussex.

On 17 June 1497 he assisted in defeating the Cornish rebels at Blackheath, for which service he was created a banneret. In 1499 he and Richard Hatton were commissioned by the king to go in quest of Edmund de la Pole, 3rd Duke of Suffolk, after his first flight to the continent, and persuade him to come back. He had a further charge to go to the Archduke Philip; but the priority was the bringing back of De la Pole, and he was instructed to forego that journey if the refugee would not return without him. In 1500 he went over with the king to the meeting with the archduke at Calais. In the same year he was elected a Knight of the Garter. In 1501, as controller of the household, he had much to do with the arrangements for the reception of Catherine of Aragon. On 4 April 1506 he had what was called a special pardon: a discharge of liabilities in respect of his offices of master of the ordnance and of the armoury, and also as master of the horse.

On 7 April 1506 in the same year he made his will. Next day he embarked at Rye along with John Whitby, prior of Gisburn in Yorkshire, on a pilgrimage to the Holy Land. They landed next day in Normandy, and passed through France, Savoy, and the north of Italy to Venice, whence, after some stay, they sailed on 3 July. After visiting Crete and Cyprus on their way they reached Jaffa on 18 Aug. But before landing they had to send a message to Jerusalem to the warden of Mount Sion, and they remained seven days in their galley till he came with the lords of Jerusalem and Rama, without whose escort no pilgrims were allowed to pass. Two more days were spent in debating the tribute to be paid by the company before they could be suffered to land, so that they only disembarked on 27 August. They were forced by the Mamelukes to spend a night and a day in a cave, and when allowed to proceed upon their journey both Guildford and the prior fell ill. They did reach Jerusalem, but the prior died there on 5 September, and Guildford the next day. Guildford's chaplain prepared an account of ‘The Pylgrymage of Sir Richard Guylforde to the Holy Land, A.D. 1506,’ which Richard Pynson printed in 1511. It was reprinted by Sir Henry Ellis for the Camden Society in 1851.

Guildford's will was proved 10 May 1508.

Marriages and issue
Guildford married firstly Anne Pympe, daughter of John Pympe of Kent, by whom he had two sons and five daughters:

 Sir Edward Guildford; married firstly, before 1496, Eleanor West (b. 1481 (daughter of Thomas West, 8th Baron De La Warr, and sister and co-heir of Thomas West, 9th Baron De La Warr), by whom he had a son, Richard, who predeceased him, and a daughter, Jane, who married John Dudley, 1st Duke of Northumberland. His second wife was Joan Pitlesden, daughter of Stephen Pidlesten.
 George Guildford; married his father's ward, Elizabeth Mortimer (daughter and heir of Robert Mortimer (d. 22 August 1485) of Landmere in Thorpe-le-Soken by Elizabeth Howard, daughter of John Howard, 1st Duke of Norfolk), by whom he had a son, Sir John Guildford, and two daughters, Anne and Mary.
 Philippa Guildford; married by settlement dated 14 April 1502, Sir John Gage (d.18 April 1556), by whom she was the mother of Alice Gage, who married Sir Anthony Browne.
 Mary Guildford; married firstly Christopher Kempe (1485-1512), their daughter Mary Finch served Mary I of England, and secondly Sir William Haute (d.1539) of Bishopsbourne, Kent, by whom she was the mother of Elizabeth Haute, wife of Thomas Culpeper of Bedgebury, in Goudhurst (son and heir of Sir Alexander Culpeper (d.1541) and elder brother of Sir Thomas Culpeper), and Jane Haute, wife of Sir Thomas Wyatt.
 Frideswide Guildford; married Sir Matthew Browne (d. 6 August 1557) of Betchworth Castle, Surrey, son of Sir George Browne (beheaded on Tower Hill 4 December 1483) by Elizabeth Paston (1 July 1429 – 1 February 1488), widow of Sir Robert Poynings (slain 17 February 1461 at the Second Battle of St Albans), and daughter of William Paston.
 Elizabeth Guildford (before 1489-1532+); married firstly Sir Thomas Well, secondly Sir Thomas Isley (1485-1518) of Sundridge, Kent, and thirdly Sir William Stafford.
 Eleanor Guildford; married Edward Haute, esquire.

He married secondly, in the presence of Henry VII and his queen, Joan Vaux (d. 1538), sister of Sir Nicholas Vaux, by whom he had a son:
 Sir Henry Guildford; married secondly Mary Wotton, daughter of Sir Robert Wotton of Boughton Malherbe, Kent.

Guildford's widow, Joan, who survived him many years, accompanied Henry VIII's sister Mary Tudor into France in 1514, and had afterwards an annuity for her service to Henry VII and his queen and their two daughters, Mary, Queen of France, and Margaret, Queen of Scots.

Notes

References

 

 

Attribution

External links
Will of Sir Richard Guldeford, proved 10 May 1508, National Archives. Retrieved 8 September 2013

Year of birth uncertain
1506 deaths
People from Rolvenden
Knights of the Garter
15th-century English people
Richard
Members of the Privy Council of England
High Sheriffs of Kent
Knights banneret of England
Court of Henry VII of England
English knights